Hvad vil De ha'? is a 1956 Danish comedy film directed by Jens Henriksen and Preben Neergaard and starring Dirch Passer.

Cast
Asbjørn Andersen as Filmproducenten
Boyd Bachmann as himself
Paul Hagen as Soldaten
Hans Kurt as Vagabonden
Buster Larsen as Motorcykelbud
Preben Mahrt as Madsen
Louis Miehe-Renard as Sømanden
Ole Monty asPatient
Preben Neergaard as Instruktøren
Henry Nielsen as Fuld mand
Dirch Passer as Jansen
Kjeld Petersen as Kjeldsen
Preben Lerdorff Rye as Sømand
Ove Sprogøe as Gæst der snakker for meget
Henrik Wiehe as Kunde
Sigrid Horne-Rasmussen as Fru Hansen
Birgitte Reimer as Hustru der spiller tjenestepige
Jessie Rindom as Kvinde der anråber politiet
Bodil Steen as Kvinde på besøg på hospital
Marguerite Viby as Klara
Jørgen Beck as Scenemester
Max Hansen
Grete Frische as Fru. Imelin

External links

1956 films
1950s Danish-language films
1956 comedy films
Danish black-and-white films
ASA Filmudlejning films
Danish comedy films